Curtis Fairchild Jones (born May 31, 1986), now a Christian minister, is the youngest person in the United States to have been tried as an adult and convicted of murder at the time of his conviction. He was about 12 years of age at the time of his conviction. Curtis was convicted of second degree murder during 1999 along with his 13-year-old sister, Catherine Jones, and subsequently incarcerated in jail in Florida. He was released from South Bay Correctional Facility on July 28, 2015.

While most states in the United States typically try juveniles under the age of 18 in a separate juvenile court, there is legal precedent of the age of majority being considered lower for some heinous crimes. For example, in Kentucky, the lowest age a juvenile may be tried as an adult, no matter how heinous the crime, is 14. The trial and subsequent conviction of a 12-year old in the United States is considered a rare (but not entirely unique) case.

References

External links
 https://web.archive.org/web/20150820112143/http://www.dc.state.fl.us/Facilities/region3/405.html

Living people
1986 births
Place of birth missing (living people)
American clergy